is a Japanese female singer-songwriter. She rose to fame in 1992 when she won the grand prix of the 16th annual Nagasaki Singing Festival at the age of 16, which resulted in her receiving a recording contract with Toshiba EMI.

After she graduated from high school, Ishimine traveled to Los Angeles, California, to receive voice training and dancing lessons. In November 1994, she released her first single Doyōbi to Pen to Udedokei (Saturday, Pen and Wristwatch).

In March 1995, Ishimine won first prize at the 5th NHK's Newcomer Singing Contest. In May, she released a cover version of the renowned song Hana, originally recorded by Shoukichi Kina, for the film Himeyuri no Tō (The Tower of Himeyuri). This, her third single, sold over 500,000 copies. She was selected to participate in the 46th annual NHK Kōhaku Uta Gassen with the song at the end of the year.

Life and career

Early life
Satoko Ishimine was born the third girl of three sisters in Naha City, Okinawa Prefecture, Japan. Her family loved listening to such legendary foreign musicians as The Carpenters and The Beatles. She started dreaming of becoming a professional singer when she was ten-year-old.

Success and struggle
Through the initiating years of her career, Ishimine established her popularity for the public as an Okinawan singer, especially due to the hit of her third single Hana. Nevertheless, she did not want to be regarded as such a matured vocalist with modest and magnificent songs as people liked her to perform those days. After five years since the debut, she started writing lyrics as she strongly desired to express herself with her own words. Around 2000, she began to play acoustic guitars to build her own style of an independent musical performer within herself.

Independence for change
In January 2001, Ishimine released her last original album for Toshiba EMI Closet, in which she was committed to writing the lyrics of more than a half of the entire songs. In 2003, she ended the contract with EMI and transferred her label to PRHYTHM. The first album for the new label Bloomy Balloon was one of the most motivated records in her career that she produced all the lyrics and most of the melodies for all the tracks. She cooperated in the whole creation of the album with the male guitarist and composer Hikaru Ishizaki, who resulted in getting married with Ishimine in March 2006.

Exploring another vista
After the ten years since she encountered her first spouse and the seven years of their marriage, Ishimine announced that she divorced Ishizaki in May 2013. Eventually for the first time in ten years, she released three songs on iTunes in the end of June. With the help of a musical director Ayami Matsuo, Ishimine produced the first cover album in her career that contains no original songs, which was released for the label Tokuma Japan in September 2014.

Discography

Singles

Original albums

Cover albums

Compilation albums

References

External links 

Official website

1975 births
20th-century Japanese actresses
20th-century Japanese women singers
20th-century Japanese singers
21st-century Japanese actresses
21st-century Japanese women singers
21st-century Japanese singers
EMI Records artists
Japanese classical musicians
Japanese folk singers
Japanese rhythm and blues singers
Japanese television actresses
Japanese women pop singers
Japanese women rock singers
Japanese women singer-songwriters
Japanese women writers
Living people
Musicians from Okinawa Prefecture
Ryukyuan people
Singers from Tokyo
Tokuma Japan Communications artists
World Music Awards winners